Mónosbél is a village and municipality in Heves County, Hungary.

References

External links 
  Mónosbél webpage

Populated places in Heves County